The following is an episode list of the television series  Slayers, an anime adaptation of the fantasy light novel series of the same title. So far, there have been five seasons with a total of 104 episodes originally aired on TV Tokyo between 1995 and 2009. The article's English air dates follow the Sunday broadcast due to sporadic schedule changes from the  International Channel.

Episode listing

Slayers (1995)
 In this arc, Lina Inverse is 15.
 Opening theme: Get Along by Megumi Hayashibara and Masami Okui.
 Ending theme: Kujikenaikara ! (Because I'll Never Give Up!) by Megumi Hayashibara and Masami Okui.

Slayers NEXT (1996)
 In this arc, Lina Inverse is 16.
 Opening theme: Give a Reason by Megumi Hayashibara.
 Ending theme: Jama wa Sasenai (Don't Interfere) by Masami Okui.

Slayers TRY (1997)
 In this arc, Lina Inverse is 17.
 Opening theme: Breeze by Megumi Hayashibara.
 Ending theme: Don't be Discouraged by Megumi Hayashibara.
 Ending theme 2: Somewhere by Houko Kuwashima in episode 26.
 Note: This is the last arc to use hand-drawn cel animation.

Slayers REVOLUTION (2008)
 In this arc, Lina Inverse is 18.
 This is the first arc to use digital animation.
 Opening theme: Plenty of Grit by Megumi Hayashibara.
 Ending theme: Revolution by Megumi Hayashibara.

Slayers EVOLUTION-R (2009)
 In this arc, Lina Inverse is 18.
 Opening theme: Front Breaking by Megumi Hayashibara.
 Ending theme: Sunadokei by Megumi Hayashibara.
 Ending theme 2: Just Begun by Megumi Hayashibara.

Notes

External links
Animerica review of Slayers Try

Slayers
Episodes